]
The Amherstburg Police Service was the independent agency responsible for providing policing services to the Town of Amherstburg, Ontario, Canada.

The agency was disbanded at the end of 2018, under Mayor Aldo DiCarlo, with the Windsor Police Service forming a semi-independent detachment to take over policing needs.

The last Chief of Police of the Amherstburg Police Service was Timothy Berthiaume, who served until the agency's disbanding.

There are currently 31 officers serving in the Amherstburg detachment of the Windsor Police, many of whom are former members of the defunct Amherstburg Police Service. Staff Sgt. Dave DeLuca is the current head of the detachment.

References

External links
 Town of Amherstburg

1957 establishments in Ontario
Law enforcement agencies of Ontario
Organizations established in 1957